Goyder Highway (B64) is a west–east link through the Mid North region of South Australia connecting Spencer Gulf to the Riverland. It is part of the most direct road route from Port Augusta (and areas beyond including Eyre Peninsula, Western Australia and the Northern Territory) to much of Victoria and southern New South Wales.

History
Goyder Highway is named after George Goyder, a government surveyor who first identified and mapped Goyder's Line which indicates the northern limit of climatic suitability for intensive agriculture in South Australia. Goyder's Line is near the highway from Crystal Brook to past Burra.

Route

Goyder Highway starts from the Augusta Highway at Crystal Brook running east then southeast. It is briefly concurrent with Horrocks Highway near Gulnare, RM Williams Way near Spalding and Barrier Highway near Burra. The highway descends from the Mount Lofty Ranges onto the plains of the Murray–Darling basin. It passes the end of Thiele Highway at Morgan and continues upstream on the north side of the Murray River to meet Sturt Highway between Barmera and Monash.

Major intersections

References

Highways in South Australia
Mid North (South Australia)